Khanqah-e-Moula, also known as Shah-e-Hamadan Masjid and Khanqah, is a mosque located in the  Old City of Srinagar in Jammu and Kashmir, India. Situated on the right bank of the river Jhelum between the Fateh Kadal and Zaina Kadal bridges, it was first built in 1395 CE, commissioned by Sultan Sikendar in memory of Mir Sayyid Ali Hamadani. It is held to be the first Khanqah—mosques associated with specific saints—in the Kashmir valley. It is one of the best examples of Kashmiri wooden architecture, and is decorated with papier mache.

Construction 

The mosque was commissioned by  Sultan Sikandar Butshikan in 1395 CE in memory of the Islamic preacher Mir Sayyid Ali Hamadani, the central figure involved in the widespread conversion to Islam in Kashmir. Also known as Shah-e-Hamadan (the King of Hamadan), the preacher came to Kashmir from the city of Hamadan, Persia in the 14th century. He is credited for the spread of Islam in Kashmir. In 1480 AD, the shrine was destroyed in a fire. The then ruler, Sultan Hassan Shah, expanded its premises and rebuilt it. In 1731 CE, the Khanqah was again destroyed by fire and then rebuilt by Abdul Barkat Khan.

Background

The current mosque structure was constructed above near the walls of an ancient temple dedicated to Hindu goddess Kali and a sacred Hindu site, It is believed by some that Sayyid Ali Hamdani had the temple of Kali  wall erected between empty land and built the present mosque. . The railing at the back of the mosque complex leads to a bright orange marking on the stone just below that suggests to the foundation belonging to the destructed Kali Shri temple. Local Hindus were involved in various communal disputes and repeated altercations by 1942, agitating for the right to build a covered shrine adjacent to the Muslim shrine, which eventually led to a boycott of Muslim-owned shops by Kashmiri Hindus.

However, others have questioned the validity of such claims, and believe it to be a revisionist attempt to re-cast history as traditional Kashmiri Hindu historians, such as Kalhana, Jonaraja and Shuk Bhatt make no mention of the existence of any temple at the site of the structure. The counterclaim stemming from the fact that a Hindu religious site also exists adjacent to the shrine and the historians have suggested that the two sites have in fact always been adjacent to one another, their proximity being representative of communal tolerance. Kashmiri Hindus have also historically held the Khanqah in high reverence.

Archaeologist R.C. Kak in Ancient Monuments of Kashmir and historian P. N. K. Bamzai in Culture and Political History of Kashmir while writing about the Khanqah, do not altogether mention anything about the possibility of the existence of a temple where the present structure stands. Historian Ashiq Husain Bhat further argues that re-purposing of Hindu shrines into Muslim ones wouldn't have been unusual, given that the overwhelming majority of Kashmiris converted to Islam, and a similar conversion of the site into a church would occur were Kashmiris to convert en masse to Christianity. The construction of Muslim shrines at Hindu sites has also been interpreted by some as an attempt by Kashmiri Muslim to maintain links to their Hindu past.

Adjacent Kali Shri Shrine 
Toward the River Jhelum, there is a wall marked with Sindoor (or Sindooram, a traditional vermilion red or orange-red colored cosmetic powder from India, usually worn by married women along the parting of their hair) but not a temple and water oozes at a place, which Kashmiri Hindus say is dedicated to goddess Kali.

Saleem Beg, a member of INTACH, states that the holy place of Hindus and the Khanqah co-existed together.

Fire of 2017 
On 15 November 2017, a fire broke out in the shrine which damaged the spire of the building. Fire tenders were brought on the scene and they managed to arrest the spread of the fire which prevented any further damage to the building.

Restoration work was immediately started and on 30 March 2018, a refurbished crown was successfully installed on the spire of the shrine.

See also 
 Jamia Masjid, Srinagar۔
 Hazratbal Shrine۔

References

External links 

Buildings and structures in Srinagar
Mosques in Jammu and Kashmir